Maria Eduardovna Sittel (born November 9, 1975 in Penza) is a Russian television presenter and an anchor on the Vesti program at Russia-1. She won the Russian TEFI award.

Early life and education 
Sittel was born on November 9, 1975 in Penza, Russia. She is the daughter of Eduard Anatolyevich Sittel, who has German ancestry, and Larisa Pavlovna.

Sittel studied at the Penza Medical Lyceum until 1993, when she transferred to the V. G. Belinsky Penza Institute of Teacher Education and majored in biology and chemistry. Later, she graduated from the All-Russian State Distance-Learning Institute of Finance and Economics with a degree in finance and credit.

Career 
Sittel began her television career in 1997 in her hometown on the program Musical Souvenir on the Penza channel "Our House". In 1998, she became a correspondent and later a news presenter on the Penza Express television channel. In 1999, she started working at State TV and Radio Broadcasting Company in Penza.

From September 24, 2001 to May 14, 2006, Sittel worked as a daily news presenter on Vesti TV channel Russia-1. In September 2003, she replaced Sergey Brilev as the regular nightly newscaster. From 2004 to 2005, she hosted the daily show Osoboe Mnenie ("Minority Report") on Radio Rossii. From May 15, 2006 to June 17, 2016, Sittel presented the nightly news with Dmitry Kiselyov (until July 2008) and Andrey Kondrashov (since September 2008).

Sittel covered the lying-in-state of Boris Yeltsin on April 25, 2007 with Nikolai Svanidze live on Channel One and Russia-1.

From 2008 to 2011, she hosted the annual program Conversation with Vladimir Putin: continued with Ernest Matskyavichus. From September 6, 2009 to December 25, 2011, she hosted the program Special Correspondent. On May 14, 2018, after a two-year break, she returned to the Vesti program.

On 18 March 2022, Sittel, together with Dmitry Guberniev, was  the host of the Moscow rally in support of the Russian invasion of Ukraine.

Participation in other TV projects 
Sittel has participated in episodes of the TV game show Fort Boyard. In 2006, Maria Sittel and her partner Vladislav Borodinov took part in the first season of the television competition Dancing with the Stars in Russia. The couple won first place, which gave them the right to participate at the Eurovision Dance Contest 2007, where they finished in seventh place.

Personal life 
Sittel is married to Alexander Lyubomirovich Tereshchenko (b. 1979). She has a younger sister, Anna Sittel, who also works at VGTRK. Until 2013, she was the presenter of the Vesti-Penza programme. Sittel is fond of photography, alpine skiing, sports and reading books.

Awards 
 Laureate of the TEFI (2005) award for News programme presenter
 Order of Friendship (June 27, 2007 ) "for her great contribution to the development of Russian television and many years of fruitful work"
 Letter of gratitude from the Government of the Russian Federation (March 31, 2009) "for active participation in the coverage of the activities of the Prime Minister of the Russian Federation"''
 Letter of gratitude from the Government of the Russian Federation (March 3, 2012) "for active participation in covering the activities of the Prime Minister of the Russian Federation"

References

External links 
 Maria Sittel on Vesti.ru
 Interview on the VGTRK website 

Penza State University alumni
Russian journalists
1975 births
Living people
Russian people of German descent